Mutations is the sixth studio album by American recording artist Beck, released on November 3, 1998, by DGC Records. Though less commercially successful than the preceding Odelay, it won a Grammy Award for Best Alternative Music Album.

Background and recording
Mutations was produced by Nigel Godrich, who was well-known at that point for his work with Radiohead. The album contains a number of Moog keyboards, acoustic guitars, and string arrangements. The production style was very different from that of his previous album Odelay, which was heavily influenced by hip hop music and contained many samples. The lyrical content of Mutations is also much more somber and serious than that on Odelay, apparent in the songs "Nobody's Fault but My Own" and "Dead Melodies".

The title Mutations may be a nod to an influential Brazilian band of the late 60s, Os Mutantes. The song "Tropicalia" pastiches the works of Brazilian tropicalia artists of the era.

Artwork and packaging
The record's front cover, a picture of Beck tangled in plastic wrap, was taken by music photographer Autumn de Wilde. Art direction was by designer Robert Fisher. The interior artwork features sculptures and drawings by artist Tim Hawkinson.

Release
Before beginning the recording sessions, Beck gained permission from the major label he was under contract with, Geffen, to release Mutations on the small indie label Bong Load Records. However, when Geffen executives heard the album, they reneged on their agreement and released the record. This led to a lawsuit filed by Beck against Geffen.

Singles were released for the songs "Tropicalia", "Cold Brains" (Australia and New Zealand only), and "Nobody's Fault but My Own" (Japan only). No promotional music videos were made for any of the singles. Beck appeared on Saturday Night Live in promotion of Mutations, performing "Tropicalia" and "Nobody's Fault but My Own".

Mutations peaked at number 13 in the US, going gold, and achieved 24 in the UK and 23 in Australia. As of July 2008, Mutations has sold 586,000 copies in the United States. As of 1999 it has sold over one million copies worldwide.

Reception

The album received critical acclaim. It gained four stars from Rolling Stone and a 9.0 from Pitchfork. Thomas Ward of AllMusic deemed the record "one of the finest albums of the 1990s".

Track listing

Bonus tracks
There are a variety of bonus tracks on non-US pressings of the album. 
"Electric Music and the Summer People" (Japanese release track 12).
"Diamond Bollocks" is track 13 on the Japanese release, whereas it is an unlisted hidden track on the US release.
"Runners Dial Zero": (UK, German releases track 13 and Japanese release track 14).
"Halo of Gold" (German limited edition track 14).
"Black Balloon" (German limited edition track 15).

Personnel
Beck – guitar, harmonica, piano, glockenspiel, synthesizer, vocals, producer
Elliot Caine – trumpet
David Campbell – arranger, conductor, viola
Larry Corbett – cello
Warren Klein – sitar, tamboura
Bob Ludwig – mastering
David Ralicke – flute, trombone
Nigel Godrich – producer, mixing
Smokey Hormel – guitar, percussion, background vocals, cuica
Joey Waronker – percussion, drums, synthesizer drums
Robert Fisher – art direction
Justin Meldal-Johnsen – bass, percussion, background vocals
Roger Manning – synthesizer, organ, keyboards, harpsichord, background vocals, percussion
John Sorenson – assistant engineer
Charlie Gross – photography
Autumn de Wilde – photography

Charts

Certifications

References

External links

Beck albums
DGC Records albums
1998 albums
Albums arranged by David Campbell (composer)
Albums produced by Nigel Godrich
Geffen Records albums
Albums produced by Beck
Grammy Award for Best Alternative Music Album